Many shapes have metaphorical names, i.e., their names are metaphors: these shapes are named after a most common object that has it. For example, "U-shape" is a shape that resembles the letter U, a bell-shaped curve has the shape of the vertical cross-section of a bell, etc. These terms may variously refer to objects, their cross sections or projections.

Types of shapes

Some of these names are "classical terms", i.e., words of Latin or Ancient Greek etymology. Others are English language constructs (although the base words may have non-English etymology). In some disciplines, where shapes of subjects in question are a very important consideration, the shape naming may be quite elaborate, see, e.g., the taxonomy of shapes of plant leaves in botany.
 Astroid
 Aquiline, shaped like an eagle's beak (as in a Roman nose)
 Bell-shaped curve
 Biconic shape, a shape in a way opposite to the hourglass: it is based on two oppositely oriented cones or truncated cones with their bases joined; the cones are not necessarily the same
 Bowtie shape, in two dimensions
 Atmospheric reentry apparatus
 Centerbody of an inlet cone in ramjets
 Bow shape
 Bow curve
 Bullet Nose an open-ended hourglass
 Butterfly curve (algebraic)
 Cocked hat curve, also known as Bicorn
 Cone (from the Greek word for « pine cone »)
 Doughnut shape
 Egg-shaped, see "Oval", below
 Geoid (From Greek Ge (γη) for "Earth"), the term specifically introduced to denote the approximation of the shape of the Earth, which is approximately spherical, but not exactly so
 Heart shape, long been used for its varied symbolism
 Horseshoe-shaped, resembling a horseshoe, cf. horseshoe (disambiguation). In botany, also called lecotropal (see below)
 Hourglass shape or hourglass figure, the one that resembles an hourglass; nearly symmetric shape wide at its ends and narrow in the middle; some flat shapes may be alternatively compared to the figure eight or hourglass
 Dog bone shape, an hourglass with rounded ends
 Hourglass corset
 Ntama
 Hourglass Nebula
 Inverted bell
 Lecotropal,  in botany, shaped like a horseshoe (see horseshoe-shaped, above). From Greek λέκος dish + -τροπος turning
 Lens or Vesica shape (the latter taking its name from the shape of the lentil seed); see also mandorla, almond-shaped
 Lune, from the Latin word for the Moon
 Maltese Cross curve
 Mandorla, almond-shaped (Italian for "almond"), often used as a frame in mediaeval Christian iconography.
 Mushroom shape, which became infamous as a result of the mushroom cloud
 Oval (from the Latin "ovum" for egg), a descriptive term applied to several kinds of "rounded" shapes, including the egg shape
 Pear shaped, in reference to the shape of a pear, i.e., a generally rounded shape, tapered towards the top and more spherical/circular at the bottom
 Rod, a 3-dimensional, solid (filled) cylinder
 Rod shaped bacteria
 Scarabaeus curve resembling a scarab
 Serpentine, shaped like a snake
 Stadium, two half-circles joined by straight sides
 Stirrup curve
 Star a figure with multiple sharp points
 Sunburst
 Tomahawk

Numbers and letters
 A-shape, the shape that resembles the capital letter A
 A-frame, the shape of a common structure that resembles the capital letter A
 A-frame house, a common style of house construction
 A-line skirt or dress
 B-shape, the shape that resembles the capital letter B
 C-shape, the shape that resembles the capital letter C
 D-shape, the shape that resembles the capital letter D
 D-ring
 Deltoid, the shape that resembles the Greek capital letter Δ
 Deltahedron
 Deltoid muscle
 River delta
 Delta wing
 E-shape, the shape that resembles the capital letter E
 Magnetic cores of transformers may be E-shaped
 A number of notable buildings have an E-shaped floorplan
 F-shape, the shape that resembles the capital letter F
 Figure 0, the shape that resembles the numeral 0
 Figure 1, the shape that resembles the numeral 1
 Figure 2, the shape that resembles the numeral 2
 Figure 3, the shape that resembles the numeral 3
 Figure 4, the shape that resembles the numeral 4
 Figure 5, the shape that resembles the numeral 5
 Figure 6, the shape that resembles the numeral 6
 Figure 7, the shape that resembles the numeral 7
 Figure 8, the shape that resembles the numeral 8
 Figure 9, the shape that resembles the numeral 9
 G-shape, the shape that resembles the capital letter G
 H-shape, the shape that resembles the capital letter H
 H-beam, a beam with -shaped section
 Goals in several sports (gridiron football (old style), Gaelic football, rugby, hurling) are described as "H-shaped"
 H topology in electronic filter design
 Also see Balbis
 I-shape, the shape that resembles the capital letter I in a serif font, i.e., with horizontal strokes
 -beam, a beam with an -shaped section
 The court in the Mesoamerican ballgame is I-shaped
 J-shape, the shape that resembles the capital letter J
 K-shape, the shape that resembles the capital letter K
 K-shaped recession
 K turn
 L-shape, the shape that resembles the capital letter 
 The L-Shaped Room
 L game
 L-shaped recession
 Lemniscate, the shape that resembles the infinity symbol
 M-shape, the shape that resembles the capital letter M (interchangeable with the W-shape)
 N-shape, the shape that resembles the capital letter N (interchangeable with the Z-shape)
 O-shape, the shape that resembles the capital letter O
 O-ring
 P-shape, the shape that resembles the capital letter P
 P-trap, a P-shaped pipe under a sink or basin
 Pi-shape, the shape that resembles the Greek capital letter Π
 Π topology in electronic filter design
 Q-shape, the shape that resembles the capital letter Q
 R-shape, the shape that resembles the capital letter R
 S-shape, the shape that resembles the capital letter S
 The sigmoid colon, an S-shaped bend in the human intestine
 S-twist, contrasted with Z-twist for yarn

 T-shape, the shape that resembles the capital letter 
 T junction
 T topology in electronic filter design
 T-shaped (chemistry)
 T-shaped skills, a format for résumés
 T-shirt
 T-pose, used in computer animation models
 U-shape, the shape that resembles the capital letter U
 U-shaped valley
 U-turn
 U-shaped recession
 Hyoid, the shape that resembles the Greek letter υ
 Hyoid bone
 V-shape, the shape that resembles the letter V, also known as the Chevron (which includes the inverted-V shape)
 V-shaped valley
 V-shaped recession
 V-shaped body – male human body shape with broad shoulders
 V-shaped passage grave
 V sign
 W-shape, the shape that resembles the capital letter W (interchangeable with the M-shape)
 W-shaped recession
 X-shape, the shape that resembles the letter X
 Saltire
 X topology in electronic filter design
 Chiasm, crossings that resemble the Greek letter χ
 Chiasmus
 Chiastic structure
 Optic chiasm
 Y-shape, the shape that resembles the letter Y
 Y-front briefs
 Pall
 Z-shape
 the shape that resembles the capital letter Z (interchangeable with the N-shape)
 Z-twist, contrasted with S-twist for yarn

See also
 List of geometric shapes
 The :Category:Curves lists numerous metaphorical names, such as
 Bean curves, also called Nephroids, from the Greek word for kidney

References

 
Shapes
Shapes
Glossary
Wikipedia glossaries using unordered lists